Hugo López Muñoz (born 29 July 1975) is a Spanish professional basketball head coach of Tokyo Z of the Japanese B.League. He has directed many professional clubs in the past. López was also head coach of the Sweden national team from 2018 to 2021.

Playing career 
López was trained in the sport of basketball with Fórum Valladolid and Northwestern High School in Albion, Pennsylvania.

Coaching career 
López began his career as an assistant basketball coach at his alma mater Northwestern High School in the United States in 2000. He remained in the country for the following season, coaching Edinboro University of Pennsylvania. In 2002, López moved back to his home country of Spain and began serving as an assistant under various head coaches for CB Villa de Los Barrios until 2009. In his final season there, he landed the same job with the Liga ACB team Lagun Aro GBC, where the head coach was Pablo Laso. In 2014, López moved to the Malabo Kings of the Equatoguinean League in Africa. In January 2015, López was named the head coach of Baloncesto Fuenlabrada in the ACB league in Spain, succeeding Luis Casimiro. He was sacked in April 2015 after not avoiding the relegation positions in the table.

On 30 September 2015, López was appointed the first head coach of the newly created Halifax Hurricanes of the National Basketball League of Canada (NBL). Team CEO Mike Brien said, "We are excited to bring a coach of this caliber to Halifax’s new NBL Canada team." After one season, the Hurricanes and López were unable to reach to come to terms on a new agreement and parted ways.

References 

http://www.mundodeportivo.com/baloncesto/acb/20160203/301869176831/ hugo-lopez-nguema-ex-real-madrid-investigados-caso-slaughter-pasaporte-falso.html

http://www.marca.com/baloncesto/acb/2016/02/04/56b396bd46163f065e8b4667.html

External links 
ACB profile 

Living people
1975 births
Sportspeople from Valladolid
Spanish basketball coaches
Spanish expatriate basketball people in Canada
Baloncesto Fuenlabrada coaches